Restoration is a novel by author Olaf Olafsson.

Synopsis
A sweeping story of love tested by the terrors and tragedies of war set in the gorgeous hills of Tuscany in the 1940s.

Having grown up in an exclusive circle of British ex-pats in Florence in the 1920s, Alice shocks everyone when she marries Claudio, the son of a minor landowner, and moves to San Martino, a crumbling villa in Tuscany. Settling into their new paradise, husband and wife begin to build their future, restoring San Martino and giving birth to a son.

But as time passes, Alice grows lonely, a restlessness that leads her into a heady social swirl of wartime Rome and a reckless affair that will have devastating consequences. While she spends time with her lover in Rome, Alice’s young son falls ill and dies, widening the emotional chasm between her and her husband—and leaving her vulnerable to the machinations of a nefarious art dealer who ensnares her in a dangerous and deadly scheme.

Returning to San Martino, Alice yearns for forgiveness. But before she can begin to make amends, Claudio disappears, and the encroaching fighting threatens to destroy everything they have built. Caught between loyalists and resisters, cruel German forces and desperate Allied troops, Alice valiantly struggles to survive, hoping the life and love she lost can one day be restored.

Critical reception
"Restoration is an elegantly constructed work of fiction, seamlessly moving between the past and the present, but what makes Olafsson's novel so compelling is his empathy and compassion for Alice Orsini, a woman trying to redeem her life in a country ravaged by war." —Ron Rash, bestselling author of Serena and The Cove

References

External links
Olaf Olafsson's official website
Harper Collins

Icelandic novels
2011 novels
Novels set in Tuscany
Fiction set in the 1940s
Icelandic-language novels